Black Drama is a two-track American spoken word record featuring two autobiographical accounts from Barbara Ann Teer and Charlie L. Russell, both leading African American figures in live theater during the 1970s. It was distributed by Smithsonian Folkways Recordings in 1973 and details their individual rises to significance in the live theatre scene of the time. It was issued via LP record on January 1, 1973. A cassette tape release of the recording was issued in 1994.

Overview

Russell describes his personal journey to playwriting and his experiences navigating the theatrical world as a Black artist. He talks about the part that Black theatre played in the civil rights movement and expresses his views on the value of producing art that speaks to the experiences of underrepresented groups.

Teer discusses her personal story of growing up in a home that appreciated the arts and her journey to becoming a prominent Black theatre performer. She talks about the difficulties she had as a Black woman working in a largely White field and explains formulating her idea for the National Black Theatre in which she eventually founded, a venue for Black artists to exhibit their work and express their cultural identity.

Track listing
Side A
"Black Theater" (Charles Russell) – 12:26
Side B
"Black Theater" (Barbara Ann Teer) – 20:42

Personnel
Charlie L. Russell – playwright (track 1)
Barbara Ann Teer – founder of National Black Theatre (track 2)
Nathan W. Garner - Producer, Liner Notes
Ronald Clyne - Designer

References

1973 albums
Spoken word albums
1970s spoken word albums
Folkways Records albums